The 1996 J.League season was the fourth season since the establishment of the J.League. The season began on March 16, 1996, and ended on November 9, 1996.

Clubs 
The following sixteen clubs participated in J.League during the 1996 season. Of these clubs, Kyoto Purple Sanga, and Avispa Fukuoka were newly promoted from Japan Football League (former).

Kashima Antlers
Urawa Red Diamonds
JEF United Ichihara
Kashiwa Reysol
Verdy Kawasaki
Yokohama Marinos
Yokohama Flügels
Bellmare Hiratsuka
Shimizu S-Pulse
Júbilo Iwata
Nagoya Grampus Eight
Kyoto Purple Sanga 
Gamba Osaka
Cerezo Osaka
Sanfrecce Hiroshima
Avispa Fukuoka

Format 
In the 1996 season, the league abolished the split-season format and followed a single-season format; sixteen clubs played in double round-robin format, a total of 30 games per club.  The games went to golden-goal extra time and penalties if needed after regulation.  A club received 3 points for any win, 1 point for PK loss, and 0 pts for regulation or extra time loss. The clubs were ranked by points, and tie breakers are in the following order: 
 Goal differential 
 Goals scored 
 Head-to-head results
 Extra match or a coin toss
The club that finished at the top of the table was declared season champion.

Changes in competition format
 Number of competing clubs increased from 14 to 16
 Followed single-season format instead of split-season format
 Suntory Final Series was held this year, instead of Suntory Championship
 Number of games per club reduced to 30 from 52 games per season

Final standings

Golden Boots ranking

Awards

Individual awards

Best Eleven

See also 
 J-League Jikkyō Winning Eleven 97 (PlayStation video game based on the 1996 season)

External links 
 J. League 1996 (RSSSF)

J1 League seasons
1
Japan
Japan